Slovakia men's national field hockey team represents Slovakia in men's international field hockey and is controlled by the Slovak Hockey Association, the governing body for field hockey in Slovakia.

Slovakia has never qualified for the Summer Olympics, World Cup or the EuroHockey Championship, they mainly compete in the EuroHockey Championship III, the third level of the European field hockey championships.

Competitive record

EuroHockey Championships

Hockey World League and FIH Series

See also
Czechoslovakia men's national field hockey team
Slovakia women's national field hockey team

References

External links
 Slovak Hockey Association

European men's national field hockey teams
National team
Field hockey